Tyne Yard (TY) is a railway yard in Birtley, England, on the East Coast Main Line, operated by DB Cargo UK. The yard is the major freight yard of the North East, with the majority of rail freight movements in Tyne and Wear from around Great Britain passing through the yard.

History

Tyne marshalling yard was part of the 1955 modernisation plan by British Railways, and was opened up to traffic in 1963. Part of the southern end of the yard was built on the former  railway station.

It is visible from trains passing on the adjacent East Coast Main Line, with the yard located on the western side of the line. , it is a major hub for the Network Rail High Output renewals programme. At least one High Output train is based here at any time. , there is a High Output Ballast Cleaner (HOBC) and Track Replacement System (TRS) serviced and maintained in the down primaries.

The yard has nine staging sidings, seven of which are under overhead lines, engineering sidings, carriage sidings, three departure roads, and the primaries which house the Network Rail centre and virtual quarry / spoil heap. The old signal box was demolished in 2015, the radio mast sometime before this.

There is a Freightliner train crew depot here which is for the signing on of Freightliner train crew based in Tyne Yard.

The yard also acts as a servicing point for railtours visiting the region, and the Smithy Lane road bridge over the northern end of the Yard is a popular location for railway photography.

The Angel of the North is visible from the yard and main line on the high ground to the East.

From 2019, the yard was used as a storage location for Class 800/801 Azumas of LNER and also of Class 802 Paragons of Hull Trains.

See also
 List of rail yards
 Rail transport in Great Britain

References

Sources

Depot Codes

External links

Rail yards in the United Kingdom
Railway depots in England
Transport in Tyne and Wear